A list of films produced in Spain in 1958 (see 1958 in film).

1958

External links
 Spanish films of 1958 at the Internet Movie Database

1958
Spanish
Films